Qifo Temple is a Buddhist temple located in Taihuai Town of Wutai County, Xinzhou, Shanxi, China.

History
The Qifo temple was first construction in the Northern Song (960-1127), rebuilt in 1466 in the Chenghua period (1447-1487) and 1734 in the Yongzheng period (1678-1735). In 1734, the temple converted to Tibetan Buddhism.

Qifo Temple was completely destroyed in the Cultural Revolution. In 1991, monk Zhengti and Bentong started to rebuild the temple. Mahavira Hall, Hall of Four Heavenly Kings, Qifo Hall, Three Saints Hall, Hall of Guru, Hall of Manjushri, and Buddhist Texts Hall were added to the temple successively.

Architecture

Qifo Hall
The Qifo Hall enshrining seven jade statues of Buddha from Myanmar. The hall in the west side of the temple.

Three Saints Hall
The Three Saints Hall in the east side of Qifo Temple. The hall enshrining the Three Saints of Hua-yan. In the middle is Sakyamuni, statues of Manjushri and Samantabhadra stand on the left and right sides of Sakyamuni's statue.

Hall of Guru
The Hall of Guru in the south of the temple enshrining the statues of Buddha.

Qifo Tower
It is the highest white marble tower in Mount Wutai. The tower was hexagonal with seven stories. It is composed of a pagoda base, a sumeru throne and a dense-eave body. The base was engraved patterns of lotuses, flowers and grasses. Each story has a nich with small statues of Buddha are carved on the body of the tower, from top to bottom, they are statues of Vipassī Buddha, Sikhī Buddha, Vessabhū Buddha, Krakucchanda, Koṇāgamana Buddha, Kassapa Buddha and Sakyamuni.

National treasure
A bell cast in 1466 in the 2nd year of Chenghua period of Ming dynasty (1368-1644) is collect in the temple.

Gallery

References

Buddhist temples in Xinzhou
Wutai County
Xinzhou